Trey Burke is an American professional basketball player.

Trey Burke may also refer to:

 Trey Burke (racing driver), (born 2004), American racing driver

See also
 Troy Bourke